WDBL (1590 AM, "Springfield's News Talk") is a radio station broadcasting a News Talk Information format. Licensed to Springfield, Tennessee, United States, the station is owned by Eliu Maldonado, through licensee Eben-ezer Broadcasting Corporation, and features programming from Citadel Media and Salem Radio Network.

References

External links
 

DBL
News and talk radio stations in the United States
Robertson County, Tennessee